The C&C 27 is a family of Canadian sailboats, that was designed by Robert W. Ball and first built in 1970. The design is out of production.

Production
The boat was built by C&C Yachts in Canada, with some also produced in the United States.

The design was developed into the Trapper 500 and built in the UK.

An "unauthorized copy" was built in Austria as the Korneuburg 27 (K 27).

Design
The C&C 27 is a small recreational keelboat, built predominantly of fibreglass, with a balsa core deck. It has a masthead sloop rig and a fixed fin keel. The first four variants (or "Marks") of the C&C 27 are refinements of the original design; the C&C 27 Mk V is a different design.

Operational history
In a review of C&C's best and worst boats, Doug Hunter wrote, "It shared many of the [C&C] 35's admirable qualities. Most notable were its phenomenally solid construction and incredible stability. It was not an outstanding performer upwind, but was a great reacher, which suited cruisers just fine. All in all, a terrific cruiser that still attracted a racing following."

In a review, Practical Sailor wrote, "this fast and handsome racer/cruiser from the 1970s is an excellent example of what made C&C Yachts such a successful company."

Variants
C&C 27 Mark I
Model in production from 1970 to 1972, with 167 produced. It has an internally-mounted spade-type rudder, displaces  and carries  of lead ballast. The boat is fitted with a Universal Atomic 4 gasoline engine. The boat has a PHRF racing average handicap of 195 with a high of 192 and low of 198. It was also built with a  taller mast as the Mark I TM.
C&C 27 Mark II
Model in production from 1972 to 1974 with 284 built. It has a taller mast with a higher aspect ratio sail plan, an internally-mounted spade-type rudder, displaces  and carries  of lead ballast. The boat has a PHRF racing average handicap of 192 with a high of 196 and low of 189.

C&C 27 Mark III
Model in production from 1974 to 1981, with 480 produced. It was never marketed as the Mark III at the time of production and this name was applied to the design later on. It has a taller rig, deeper keel with less ballast, an internally-mounted spade-type rudder of higher aspect ratio , displaces  and carries  of lead ballast. Wheel steering was introduced in 1976 and a diesel engine in 1978. The design was initially fitted with a Universal Atomic 4 gasoline engine, although later on the Yanmar SYP 12 diesel engine became standard equipment. The boat has a PHRF racing average handicap of 177 with a high of 192 and low of 174.
C&C 27 Mark IV
Model in production 1981 to 1982 with 56 produced. It has an internally-mounted spade-type rudder, displaces  and carries  of lead ballast. The boat is fitted with a Japanese two-cylinder Yanmar 2GM diesel engine.
C&C 27 Mark V
The C&C 27 Mk V was a new design.

See also
List of sailing boat types

Similar sailboats
Aloha 27
Cal 27
Cal 2-27
Cal 3-27
C&C SR 27
Catalina 27
Catalina 270
Catalina 275 Sport
Crown 28
CS 27
Edel 820
Express 27
Fantasia 27
Halman Horizon
Hotfoot 27
Hullmaster 27
Hunter 27
Hunter 27-2
Hunter 27-3
Irwin 27 
Island Packet 27
Mirage 27 (Perry)
Mirage 27 (Schmidt)
Mirage 275
O'Day 272
Orion 27-2
Watkins 27
Watkins 27P

References

External links

Keelboats
1970s sailboat type designs
Sailing yachts 
Sailboat type designs by Robert W. Ball
Sailboat types built by C&C Yachts